East Carroll may refer to: 

 East Carroll Parish, Louisiana
 East Carroll Township, Cambria County, Pennsylvania

See also 
 Carol (disambiguation)